Wałowice-Kolonia  is a village in the administrative district of Gmina Józefów nad Wisłą, within Opole Lubelskie County, Lublin Voivodeship, in eastern Poland.

The village has an approximate population of 50.

References

Villages in Opole Lubelskie County